Maria Matthaiou (born 26 April 1997) is a Cypriot footballer who plays as a goalkeeper for Apollon Ladies F.C. and the Cyprus women's national team.

References

1997 births
Living people
Women's association football goalkeepers
Cypriot women's footballers
Cyprus women's international footballers